The 14th Infantry Division (Dutch: 14de Infanterie Divisie) was an infantry division of the Belgian Army that fought against the German armed forces in the Battle of Belgium.

World War II 
As a part of Second reserve, the 14th Infantry Division, like its counterparts, were armed with the outdated antiquated weaponry from World War I. As a result of an lack of antitank/aircraft equipment, the 14th Infantry Division had to count on 1st infantry Division for antitank support. Although the combat capabilities of the 14th Infantry Division were never in doubt, they could count on their reconnaissance cyclists unit, which wasn't withdrawn when the fighting begun, unlike most of the other infantry divisions.

Stationed on the Albert Canal, the 14th Infantry Division oversaw the destruction of the bridges over the canal, and later, were continuously being attacked by the Germans. A breakthrough in the sector of the Albert Canal manned by 7th Infantry Division caused the entire front to fall back to the K-W line.

In contrast to many infantry divisions, who organized a planned retreat to the K-W line, the 14th Infantry Division caught itself in a unorganized and slow retreat.

The morale of the 14th Infantry Division was deterred, and discipline collapsed in the lines. With the Germans advance not showing a sign of stopping, 14th Infantry Division was eventually encountered by the Germans and was reduced to remnants. Two regiments of the line were wiped out in the impending German onslaught, and the remainder were not in a condition to engage the Germans.

Confirmed as no longer deployable, the 14th Infantry Division was transferred to the coastal areas near Zeeland and undertook no further fighting against the Germans.

The 14th Infantry Division only fought the Germans for six days before being forwarded to the coast, where they will be stationed until on May 28, when the division were disbanded following the surrender of Belgium.

Structure 1940 
Structure of the division at the eve of the Battle of Belgium.

•Headquarters, at Herk-de-stad

•Commanding General, 14th Infantry Division -Lieutenant- General Armand Massart

°35th Line Regiment

°36th Line Regiment

°38th Line Regiment

°22nd Artillery Regiment

°13th Battalion Engineer

°14th Company of Transmission Troops

°Cyclist Group 14ID(to the 14th Infantry Division)

See also 
 Battle of Belgium
 Army Group B
 1st Infantry Division
 7th Infantry Division
 Zeelandic Flanders (the coastal area the 14th Infantry Division occupies until capitulation)

References

Belgian military personnel of World War II
Battle of Belgium
Military units and formations of Belgium in World War II